The Las Virgenes Stakes is a Grade III American Thoroughbred horse race for three-year-old fillies over the distance of one mile on the dirt scheduled annually in late January or early February at Santa Anita Park in Arcadia, California. The event currently carries a purse of $200,000.

History

The event was named after the Rancho Las Virgenes land grant in the Santa Monica Mountains and Simi Hills. The event was inaugurated on 26 February 1983 with Saucy Bobbie victorious, who was ridden by US Hall of Fame jockey Laffit Pincay Jr. and trained by US Hall of Fame trainer Lazaro S. Barrera in a time of 1:36.

The event was scheduled in Southern California as a natural progression for three-year-old fillies with the Santa Ynez Stakes over 7 furlongs in January, Las Virgenes Stakes over one mile in February and the Santa Susana Stakes, later renamed as the Santa Anita Oaks over  miles in March.

Althea, winner of the second running in 1984 later that spring became the first filly to win the Arkansas Derby.

The event was upgraded to Grade III in 1985. The winner that year was Fran's Valentine who was first over the line in her first race, the inaugural 1984 Breeders' Cup Juvenile Fillies at Hollywood Park but was disqualified and place tenth. With the obvious quality of the runners in 1987 the event was upgraded to Grade II and the following year in 1988 the event reached Grade I status.

The event has produced an outstanding number of fillies that have gone on to be champions both in their sophomore year and even later to become Champions winning Breeders' Cup events.

These include Goodbye Halo and Lite Light who went on to win the Kentucky Oaks and Coaching Club American Oaks. Serena's Song went on to defeat colts in the Jim Beam Stakes and Haskell Invitational Handicap en route to becoming US Champion Three-Year-Old Filly for 1995. The 2000 winner Surfside defeated older horses in the Grade II Clark Handicap also capturing US Champion Three-Year-Old Filly honors. The 2007 winner Rags to Riches became a US Classic winner when she won the Belmont Stakes and going on to capture US Champion Three-Year-Old Filly honors. The US Champion Two-Year-Old Filly Champion Beholder won this race and went on to win the 2013 Breeders' Cup Distaff and was named US Champion Three-Year-Old Filly that year.

In 2016 the event was downgraded to Grade II and again in 2021 to Grade III.

The event is part of the Road to the Kentucky Oaks.

Records
Speed record:
 1:34.86 –  Zazu  (2011)

Margins:
13 lengths – Adare Manor (2022)

Most wins by a jockey:
 4 – Corey Nakatani (1991, 1995, 1997, 2005)
 4 – Gary Stevens (1987, 1992, 1993, 2014)

Most wins by a trainer:
 7 – Bob Baffert (1999, 2003, 2012, 2015, 2018, 2022, 2023)

Most wins by an owner:
 3 – Robert & Beverly Lewis (1995, 2003, 2004)
 3 – Spendthrift Farm (2013, 2015, 2021)

Las Virgenes Stakes – Santa Anita Oaks double:
 Althea †(1984), Fran's Valentine †(1985), Timely Assertion (1987), Lite Light (1991), Lakeway (1994), Serena's Song (1995), Antespend (1996), Sharp Cat (1997), Excellent Meeting (1999), Surfside (2000), Golden Ballet (2001), You (2002), Composure (2003), Balance (2006), Rags to Riches (2007), Stardom Bound (2009), Beholder (2013), Fashion Plate (2014), Songbird (2016), Bellafina (2019)

Notes:

† Santa Anita Oaks was known as the Santa Susana Stakes.

Winners

Legend:

See also
Road to the Kentucky Oaks
List of American and Canadian Graded races

References

Horse races in California
Santa Anita Park
Flat horse races for three-year-old fillies
Graded stakes races in the United States
Recurring sporting events established in 1983
Grade 3 stakes races in the United States
1983 establishments in California